Wang Dong (1922–1983) was a Chinese diplomat. He was Ambassador of the People's Republic of China to Sweden (1969–1971) and Canada (1977–1983).

1922 births
1983 deaths
Ambassadors of China to Sweden
Ambassadors of China to Canada